LOVE 97.2FM (最爱频道 in Chinese) is a radio station of Mediacorp in Singapore. It is an adult contemporary music station which plays in Mandarin and contemporary hit radio from the 1980s to 2000s as well as giving entertainment lifestyle bites. It is mainly aimed at bilingual workers aged 25 to 35 years, which helps listeners to relax and enjoy themselves in their busy work life. Love 972 ended its broadcast at Caldecott Broadcast Centre on 3 February 2017 and then it was moved to Mediacorp Campus at one-north from 6 February 2017. The first programme broadcast from there was at 07:00 hrs on 6 February.

Show produced 
 https://tv.mewatch.sg/en/channel8/shows/yjhc/the-love-97-2-breakfast-quartet-7315748
 https://tv.mewatch.sg/en/tv/shows/th/the-love-97-2-breakfast-quartet-s2-2/info
 https://tv.mewatch.sg/en/tv/shows/th/the-love-97-2-breakfast-quartet-listen-to-me/info

See also
List of radio stations in Singapore

References

External links

1994 establishments in Singapore
Radio stations established in 1994
Radio stations in Singapore
Mandarin-language radio stations